The Rolling Valley Conference is a high school athletic conference in west central Iowa. The league began play in the 2013–14 season. Members include five former members of the Western Valley Activities Conference, five former members of the Rolling Hills Conference, and one former member of the West Central Activities Conference.

Schools

Former schools

History
Five members of the conference came from the Western Valley Activities Conference, which was formed in 2008 by the merger of the Maple Valley Conference and the Boyer Valley Conference. All five members of the Rolling Valley were members of the Boyer Valley Conference before the merger. The Boyer Valley league dated to the 1960s and included as many as twelve schools at one time in its history. With the number of members dwindling, they looked into a merger with the Maple Valley Conference. The league was an odd mix of schools, however, as the conference spanned over 160 miles. Also, the conference included schools with a wide range of sizes with the majority of the former Boyer Valley schools much smaller than most of the Maple Valley schools. 

Five other league members were part of the Rolling Hills Conference before the formation of the league. The forerunners of CAM and EHK-Exira were charter members of the league when it was founded in the late 1970s. Adair–Casey and Coon Rapids–Bayard were founding members of the new West Central Activities Conference around the same time and Adair–Casey joined the Rolling Hills in 1996. Glidden–Ralston and Paton-Churdan were added to the West Central at that time as replacements for Adair–Casey and other schools. In 2007, Paton-Churdan joined the Rolling Hills and Glidden–Ralston followed in 2009. The Rolling Hills Conference included nine members by the 2012–13 school year, however the nature of the conference had changed in recent years, as the once compact conference had become spread out due to the addition of three private schools in the Des Moines area. Four of the league's members decided to explore the option of forming a new conference with other similar schools. Coon Rapids–Bayard, which had become the smallest and most western member of the West Central Activities Conference following the departures of Paton-Churdan and Glidden–Ralston was also included in the proposed conference. Paton-Churdan was not originally included in the new league, but petitioned to join and were accepted. With Paton-Churdan leaving the conference and Walnut closing its high school, the Rolling Hills Conference played its last season in 2012–13. The four remaining members (Orient-Macksburg and the Christian schools) joined the Bluegrass Conference in 2013.

Charter Oak–Ute began sharing with Maple Valley–Anthon–Oto of the Western Valley Activities Conference during the 2017–18 season.

External links
 Official Website

References

High school sports conferences and leagues in the United States
High school sports in Iowa
2013 establishments in Iowa
Sports leagues established in 2013